Jardee is a small town in the South West region of Western Australia. It is situated along the South Western Highway between Manjimup
and Pemberton.

It was originally a railway siding named Jardanup, which had been established in 1912 during the construction of the Bridgetown to Wilgarup railway line. Jardanup was the terminus built to service the No. 1 state saw mill, also built in 1912.

In 1920 the railway line spread during the visit of Edward Prince of Wales, (the future King Edward VIII) derailing the royal train.  In most reports the location was identified as "ten miles from Bridgetown".

The name of the town was changed to Jardee in 1925 as it was often confused with Dardanup, and the town was gazetted in 1927.

The name is a portmanteau of the  Aboriginal word for the area Jardanup and the name of a historic property in the area, Deeside.

References

Towns in Western Australia
South West (Western Australia)